State Road 531 (NM 531) is a  state highway in the US state of New Mexico. NM 531's western terminus is a continuation as NM 572 in La Puente, and the eastern terminus is at NM 162 in Tierra Amarilla.

Major intersections

See also

References

531
Transportation in Rio Arriba County, New Mexico